Bertiella is a genus of fungi in the family Teichosporaceae.

The genus name of Bertiella is in honour of Giuseppe Berti, an Italian agricultural engineer from Porto Maurizio.

References

External links
Index Fungorum

Pleosporales